The This Is Us Tour was the eighth concert tour by American boy band, the Backstreet Boys. The tour promotes their seventh studio album, This Is Us (2009). The tour reached Europe, Asia, Australasia and the Americas. The tour was the second and final concert tour that the band had performed as a quartet before the original member Kevin Richardson returned on April 29, 2012.

Background
With the announcement of their seventh studio album, the band reported they will spend the latter half of 2009 and all of 2010 on the road. The trek began in Europe in October 2009 and ended in South America in March 2011. Band member, Howie Dorough stated the tour was not a comeback tour, after the sluggish sales of their last album. He stated the band has matured during their nearly 20 years in the music industry. This maturity would be reflected in their album and upcoming tour. He was later interviewed by Jam!, where he stated the band were in tour rehearsals and this would be the first tour in which the group had background dancers since 2001. To promote the tour, the band did several promotional performances in the United States, Japan, Spain and Switzerland. Some performances were cancelled due to the member Brian Littrell contracting H1N1. To introduce the tour, Nick Carter stated:

"[It's] a pop show, dancing, singing, cool gags, just big energy, explosions. You get to see a group who hopefully you've liked through the years. We perform our biggest hits -- we've got 10 or 12 top 10 hits around the world that people know -- so we perform those as well as songs off our new record. It's just jam-packed. We've got four dancers and big production."

While on tour, it was announced the band will perform aboard Carnival Cruise Lines, Carnival Destiny with a show titled, "SS Backstreet"—done in similar vein to the New Kids on the Block and Boyz II Men. During the summer of 2010, the Backstreet Boys joined New Kids on the Block onstage at the Radio City Music Hall (as a part of NKOTB Casi-NO Tour), where the groups performed "I Want It That Way". Since the performance, the media began to circulate rumors of the two uniting for a tour in the summer of 2011. The tour is created by Live Nation Entertainment as an outlet to reignite the boy band fad in the United States.

The tour, named the NKOTBSB Tour,  was officially announced on On Air with Ryan Seacrest. Due to demand, the Backstreet Boys continued their tour into 2011 with additional dates in South America and Asia.

Opening acts
Ricki-Lee Coulter (Australia)
J Williams (New Zealand)
Mindless Behavior (North America) (select dates)
Tino Coury (Pittsburgh show only) 
Madcon (London, O2 Arena)
Dan Talevski (North America) (select dates)
Shawn Desman (North America) (select dates)

Set list
There was a concert DVD of the tour held in Japan.

Tour dates

Festivals and other miscellaneous performances
This concert was a part of the "Jingle Bell Ball"
These concerts were a part of "Rock 'n India"
This concert was a part of the "Ravinia Festival"
This concert was a part of the "Boise Music Festival"
This concert was a part of "Mixfest"
These concerts were a part of the "SS Backstreet"

Cancellations and rescheduled shows

Box office score data

Broadcasts and recordings
For the live DVD, the concert at the Nippon Budokan in Tokyo, Japan was filmed on February 18, 2010, and sold through Japanese websites. It was released under the title "Backstreet Boys: This Is Us Japan Tour 2010."

Critical reception
Overall, the tour received positive feedback from music critics in each region the band toured. The quartet received a four of five star review from Kate Watkins (City Life). She writes, "Show Me The Meaning Of Being Lonely demonstrated the tight vocals they have developed over the last decade. And just to inform pop music sceptics they sang live and didn't mime even though the show was laced with energetic choreography."

Ed Power (The Independent) provided the group with a positive review stating, "Backstreet also deserve credit for not over-indulging in the customary patronising patter you get from most pop acts. Instead of repetitive shout outs of, "how you doing Dublin", the Boys simply churn out hit after hit without pausing for breath. Sure, they haven't re-invented the wheel musically, yet they prove in style that they've already left a considerable legacy of entertainment." Vicki Kellaway (Liverpool Echo) gave the band a 10 out 10 remarking, "They are utterly shameless. You might think four men with an average age of 32 (I’m sorry to remind you of that) would feel they are beyond the baggy jeans, printed hoodies, huge trainers and exaggerated ‘running man’ dance moves. Oh no. You might as well give a crowd what they want. This was not one of those we'll-hit-you-with-our-new-material and throw in a medley for fun. It was pure nostalgia."

For their concert at the Challenge Stadium in Perth, Sandra Bahbah (The Sunday Times) stated. "There is not one person who will dispute that The Backstreet Boys are as corny as a heart-shaped box of chocolates on Valentine's Day, but like that item, they are a sweet treat.  Their boy band dance moves were impressive but definitely giggle-worthy as one could only describe them as over the top.  They had four female back-up dancers to help with the evening's entertainment and more costume changes than a Beyonce concert, but by gosh it was fun to watch." Rebecca Barry (The New Zealand Herald) did not think highly of the band's performance at Auckland's Vector Arena. She wrote, "The band still rely on their old stable of choreographed white-man manoeuvres: it's raining on my face, the lawn mower, side-scissor robot shuffle – and Carter's fans' favourite, slowly-remove-jacket-to-show-off-newly-sculpted-arms. Seriously, you could hardly recognise the guy. Smarmy though he was, his voice soared on ballads such as Incomplete."

When the band returned stateside, the accolades continued. Alison Chriss  (Creative Loafing) wrote, "The crowd left elated and ready to gab about the show. I heard a few guys commenting on how BSB updated their choreography, and even my husband admitted that, overall, the show was pretty good. For a trip down Pop music's memory lane, it was a great one, and my 14-year-old self is finally at peace after having the ultimate boy-band experience to end Memorial Day Weekend!" Keegan Prosser (The News Tribune) wrote, "The night proved to be a perfect flashback for the fans that have been there since the beginning, even if the nostalgia of it all left me longing for the sugary-pop of yesteryear. And despite the fact that the Boys in the Backyard are, today, a little more like Men in the Backyard (creepy), it seems to me they’ve still got a few tricks up those bedazzled sleeves."

Personnel
Lead Vocals: Brian Littrell, Howie Dorough, Nick Carter, AJ McLean
Tour Director: Frank Gatson Jr.
Tour Manager: 
Assistant Tour Manager: 
Co-Director: 
Co-Director: 
Tour Accountant: 
Musical Director: Kim Burse
Costume Design: 
Choreographer: Rich and Tone Talauega

Security
Michael "Mike" Elgani: Nick's Security*
Drew Philip: Head of Security/Road Manager/Brian's Security
Josh Naranjo: Howie's Security
Marcus Johnson: AJ's Security
John "Q" Elgani: Security*

Band
Keyboards: 
Guitars: 
Percussion: 
Bass: 
Drums:

Dancers
Jamie Overla
Mayuko Kitayama
Tye Myers
Giggi Thesman
Ashley Ashida Dixon (2009 European Leg)

Notes
 Nick's bodyguard, Mike, is Q's little brother

References

External links 

2009 concert tours
2010 concert tours
2011 concert tours
Backstreet Boys concert tours